This is a list of all tornadoes that were confirmed throughout Europe by the European Severe Storms Laboratory and local meteorological agencies during 2010. Unlike the United States, the original Fujita Scale and the TORRO scale are used to rank tornadoes across the continent.

European yearly total

January

January 1 event

January 5 event

January 9 event
F? in Croatia

January 10 event
F1 in Turkey

January 23 event
F? in Portugal

February

February 2 event
F1 in Turkey

February 3 event
F1 / T3 in Turkey

February 5 event
F0 / T1 in France
F0 in France

February 7 event
F? in Turkey

February 12 event
F? in Greece

February 21 event
F? in Spain
F1 in Spain

February 22 event
F0 / T1 in Portugal
F1 / T2 in Portugal
F0 / T1 in Belgium

February 23 event
F? in Spain
F1 in Portugal

February 25 event
F1 in France

March

March 7 event
F1 in Turkey

March 16 event
F2 in Turkey
F? in Turkey

March 29 event
F1 / T2 in France
F1 in France
F? in Turkey

March 30 event
F1 in France

March 31 event
F1 in Italy

April

April 7 event
F0 in France

April 8 event
F1 in Turkey
F1 in Turkey

April 16 event
F1 in Portugal
F? in Portugal
F1 in Spain
F? in Spain

April 18 event
F? in Spain

April 21 event
F? in Turkey

April 27 event
F0 / T0 in Italy

May

May 6 event
F0 in Italy

May 7 event
F? in Croatia
F1 in Croatia

May 10 event
F? in Russia

May 12 event
F? in Russia
F? in Serbia

May 13 event
F? in Italy
F? in Austria

May 14 event
F? in Hungary

May 16 event
F1 in Croatia
F1 in Serbia

May 17 event
F? in Croatia

May 18 event
F? in Ukraine
F? in Ukraine
F? in Ukraine
F2 / T4 in Poland
F? in Poland

May 19 event
F1 in Italy

May 20 event
F1 / T3 in Poland
F0 in Poland

May 21 event
F? in Denmark

May 24 event
F2 in Germany
F3 in Germany 1 fatality
F? in Czech Republic
F1 in Poland
F1 / T2 in Poland
F1 / T3 in Poland
F0 / T1 in Hungary

May 25 event
F1 / T3 in Ukraine
F2 / T5 in Ukraine
F? in Ukraine
F? in Russia

May 26 event
F1 / T3 in Austria
F2 / T4 in Austria
F1 / T3 in Romania

May 29 event
F2 in Turkey

May 30 event
F0 / T1 in Hungary
F? in Hungary

May 31 event
F? in Serbia

June

June 2 event
F1 in Hungary
F? in Hungary

June 5 event
F? in Russia
F1 in Russia
F1 / T2 in Russia

June 6 event
F? in Belgium
F? in Belgium

June 8 event
F1 / T3 in Russia
F2 in the United Kingdom
F? in the United Kingdom
F? in the Netherlands

June 9 event
F1 / T2 in Germany
F1 / T3 in Germany

June 11 event
F? in Germany
F0 in France

June 12 event
F? in Armenia
F2 / T4 in Russia

June 14 event
F1 in Russia
F1 / T3 in Russia
F? in France
F? in France
F? in Hungary

June 16 event
F1 in Romania

June 18 event
F0 in Greece
F1 in Romania

June 19 event
F0 in Italy
F0 in Italy
F1 in Italy
F0/T0 in Slovenia

June 20 event
F2 in Belarus
F? in Ukraine

June 21 event
F1 in Italy
F? in Armenia
F? in Czech Republic

June 22 event
F1 in Ukraine
F1/T3 in Norway

June 23 event
F1/T2 in Ukraine

June 27 event
F? in Russia
F1/T3 in Russia

June 28 event
F? in Romania

June 29 event
F? in Ukraine
F? in Turkey

June 30 event
F? in Ukraine

July

July 5 event
F? in Italy

July 6 event
F1/T3 in Ukraine
F? in Romania

July 7 event
F? in Russia
F1/T2 in Russia
F? in Russia

July 8 event
F1 in Russia

July 9 event
F? in Russia

July 11 event
F? in Ukraine
F1 in Russia
F? in Sweden

July 12 event
F? in Germany
F? in the Netherlands
F0 in France
F? in Sweden

July 13 event
F0/T1 in Sweden
F0/T1 in Sweden
F? in Sweden

July 14 event
F1 in Belgium
F? in the Netherlands
F? in Germany
F? in Germany

July 16 event
F? in Belgium

July 17 event
F0 in Italy

July 18 event
F1 in Sweden
F1 in Sweden

July 19 event
F2/T4 in Ukraine

July 21 event
F? in Ukraine
F1/T2 in Russia

July 22 event
F1 in Sweden
F? in Sweden

July 23 event
F0 in Austria
F? in Italy
F? in Italy
F0 in France

July 24 event
F1/T2 in Croatia
F? in Latvia

July 26 event
F? in Serbia
F? in Serbia
F1/T3 in Ukraine
F1 in Finland

July 27 event
F1 in Ukraine

July 28 event
F0 in the Netherlands
F1/T3 in Romania
F? in Lithuania
F? in Belarus
F? in Belarus
F? in Latvia

July 29 event
F? in Denmark
F? in Germany
F? in Russia
F1/T3 in Russia
F? in Russia
F1/T3 in Russia

July 30 event
F0 in Italy
F? in Italy

August

August 2 event
F0 in France

August 4 event
F? in Germany
F1 in Finland
F? in Finland

August 5 event
F? in Germany
F0 in Austria

August 6 event
F? in Ukraine

August 8 event
F2/T4 in Estonia

August 10 event
F1 in Russia

August 14 event
F2/T4 in Hungary

August 15 event
F? in Slovakia
F? in Hungary

August 16 event
F? in Italy
F? in Hungary
F? in Hungary
F? in Slovakia

August 17 event
F? in Poland
F? in Poland
F? in Germany
F0/T1 in Germany

August 18 event
F? in Russia
F? in Lithuania

August 19 event
F2 in Russia

August 20 event
F1/T2 in Norway

August 22 event
F? in Germany
F? in Germany
F0/T1 in France

August 23 event
F2/T5 in France
F2/T5 in Germany
F2/T4 in Germany
F? in Germany
F? in Germany
F? in Germany
F1/T3 in the United Kingdom

August 24 event
F1 in Finland
F? in Czech Republic

August 26 event
F? in Germany
F1/T3 in France

August 27 event
F1/T3 in Germany
F2/T5 in Poland
F? in Poland

August 28 event
F? in Denmark
F? in Germany

August 30 event
F1 in Germany

August 31 event
F1 in Greece

See also 
 Tornadoes of 2010

Tornadoes of 2010
 2010
European tornadoes in 2010
Tornadoes
2010-related lists